The Golden Rose Award, one of America’s oldest literary prizes, was inaugurated in 1919.
The rose was modeled after the Gold Rose which is now in the Cluny Museum in Paris.  The New England Poetry Club awards the Rose annually for American poetry.

List of winners

References

American poetry awards
Awards established in 1919